The Men's Gymnasium (now part of the Indiana University School of Public Health-Bloomington building) is an on-campus indoor athletic facility on the campus of Indiana University in Bloomington, Indiana. From 1917–1928 it also served as the home of the Indiana Hoosiers men's basketball team.

Current use
The Men's Gymnasium, more commonly referred to now as part of the School of Public Health-Bloomington building, is part of a complex for the Indiana University School of Public Health-Bloomington, as well as the recreational programs offered by the school's Division of Recreational Sports. The Men's Gymnasium, together with the Wildermuth Intramural Center, make up the SPHB complex.

History
On January 19, 1917, the Indiana Hoosiers began playing in the Men's Gymnasium, a Gothic basketball cathedral. The team won their initial game against Iowa 12–7. The low score was attributed to both teams struggling to adjust to the new baskets in the arena.

The new facility was built from Indiana limestone and cost $250,000. In addition to the basketball portion, it included an indoor track, a pool, locker rooms, offices for athletics and staff, and a trophy room. The primary focal point of the facility was a 2,400-seat basketball arena on the second floor. It was simply called the new Men's Gymnasium, and for the first few years was often just called the "New Gym."

After the first few games spectators complained that they could not see the game because of opaque wooden backboards. The Nurre Mirror Plate Company in Bloomington was employed to create new backboards that contained one-and-a-half inch thick plate glass so that fans could see games without an obstructed view. It was the first facility in the country to use glass backboards.

Indiana's first All-American, Everett Dean, played in the facility. Later he returned as head coach for the team and won a Big Ten Conference championship in his second season in 1925–26. The basketball team's last season in the facility was in 1927–28, when the team again won the conference championship. Because of the growing popularity of basketball at the school, the team needed a larger arena to host games and moved to the Old Fieldhouse.

Swastika tiles

Tiles in the building depict symbols representing health and well-being in various cultures, including swastikas, a symbol which later became negatively associated with and pre-dated Germany's Third Reich. A plaque in the lobby addresses this and reads:
Installed in 1917 with the construction of the original IU Men’s Gymnasium building, the elaborate ceramic tiles in the foyer of each wing contain symbols from cultures around the world. These beautiful and historic tiles represent themes of energy, movement, good fortune, prosperity, growth, health, and harmony.  Collectively they represent aspirations for a healthy life through fitness and wellbeing.

Among the tiles you may see are equilateral crosses with four arms bent at 90°, known historically as swastikas. The word swastika comes from the Sanskrit svastika - "su" meaning "good," "asti" meaning "to be," and "ka" as a suffix. Thus, swastika, literally means "to be good."

The origins of this symbol are quite ancient. The earliest archaeological evidence of these ornaments dates back to the Indus Valley Civilization, Ancient India, as well as Classical Antiquity. The spiritual design has been used by Greeks, Romans, Celts, Buddhists, Jainists, Hindus, and Native Americans. Up until its adoption, in a modified form, by the National Socialist German Workers' (Nazi) Party, it was very commonly used as a symbol of good fortune for thousands of years worldwide.

The display of the ancient symbol on these walls should in no way be interpreted as an endorsement of the political and social ideologies of the Nazi party and the atrocities the regime committed. Its inclusion here in its historical form predates the rise to power and horrific abuses of the Nazis.

The inclusion of this motif should be interpreted in its most pure and benign form, as a token of wellbeing, as it was intended when the building was constructed.

References

External links
 Indiana University School of Public Health

Defunct college basketball venues in the United States
Indiana Hoosiers basketball venues
Sports venues in Indiana